McCreary County Airport  is a public airport located in unincorporated McCreary County, Kentucky, USA,  northeast of the central business district (CBD) of Pine Knot. It is a very small, publicly owned public-use general aviation airport. The airport lies adjacent to United States Penitentiary, McCreary and has one unattended hangar containing several ultralight aircraft. Its elevation is 1370 MSL and it has one well-maintained asphalt runway, 4/22.

In 2003, Senator Jim Bunning announced that federal funding was being extended to McCreary County Airport.  Plans are in development to extend the runway and build additional hangar space.

References 

Airport Master Record (FAA Form 5010), also available as a printable form (PDF)

External links 

Airports in Kentucky
Buildings and structures in McCreary County, Kentucky
Transportation in McCreary County, Kentucky